Kyle Alan Mack (born July 6, 1997) is an American snowboarder from West Bloomfield, Michigan, who specializes both Slopestyle and Big Air. On March 4, 2016, he won the US Open Men's Slopestyle final. At the 2018 Pyeongchang Winter Olympics, he won the silver medal in the Men's Big Air final.

Career
Mack's career began at the age of three, as he would ride down the driveway after every snowfall. At five, he began regularly riding Alpine Valley; he would never leave regardless of the weather conditions. His dedication caused Burton Snowboards to notice him at the age of seven, resulting in sponsorship. In 2010, he placed first in the Burton Open Junior Jam which skyrocketed him to new heights.

In 2011, he was invited to join the US Snowboarding Team. Over the next several years, endless competitions and traveling of the world followed his massive achievements. He has competed in several countries' Open competitions, multiple Dew Tours, and many Grand Prix. He won a bronze medal in both big air and Slopestyle at the FIS Freestyle Ski and Snowboarding World Championships 2015, behind Roope Tonteri and Darcy Sharpe. In 2016, he placed second at the Los Angeles stop of the Air & Style tour. On March 4, 2016, he placed first at the US Open in Men's Slopestyle.

References

External links

American male snowboarders
1997 births
Living people
Sportspeople from Detroit
Snowboarders at the 2018 Winter Olympics
Medalists at the 2018 Winter Olympics
Olympic silver medalists for the United States in snowboarding
20th-century American people
21st-century American people